After the Reign may refer to:

 After the Reign (album), an album by Blackfoot
 After the Reign (band), an American country music band